Otodus aksuaticus is an extinct species of large shark in the family Otodontidae which may represent a transitional species between Otodus obliquus and Otodus auriculatus. They are similar in overall morphology to Otodus obliquus except they have serrations on their cusps and blade. It is sometimes placed in the genus Otodus. It is mainly found in the Ypresian stage of the Eocene epoch. They have been found in the Woodstock Member of the Nanjemoy Formation of Maryland and Virginia and Ypresian sediments in Aktulagay, Kazakhstan as well as the Ypres clay in Belgium and the London Clay in the United Kingdom.

References

aksuaticus
Ypresian life
Eocene fish of North America
Paleontology in Maryland
Paleontology in Virginia
Eocene fish of Europe
Paleogene Belgium
Fossils of Belgium
Paleogene England
Fossils of England
Fossil taxa described in 1928